Setmurthy is a civil parish in Allerdale, Cumbria, England, historically part of Cumberland, within the Lake District National Park in England.  In the 2011 census it had a population of 110. The spelling "Satmurthawe" is seen in 1473.

The River Derwent forms the northern and eastern boundary of the parish, separating it from Blindcrake. Bassenthwaite Lake forms the eastern boundary, and the parish is then bordered by Above Derwent to the south east, Embleton to the west and south, and Cockermouth and Bridekirk to the west. The main settlement is the  hamlet of Dubwath.

The parish church of St Barnabas, built in 1794, is grade II listed; it is in the Diocese of Carlisle and the Binsey Mission Community.

Watch Hill, also known as Setmurthy Common, reaches  and because of its relative isolation qualifies as a marilyn, a hill with 150 m of topographic prominence. He comments that "It is easily attained with a minimum of effort: a stroll on grass so simple that boots are incongruous footwear for it and bare feet appropriate".

Governance
Setmurthy is within the Copeland UK Parliamentary constituency,  Trudy Harrison is the Member of parliament.

Before Brexit, it was in the North West England European Parliamentary Constituency.

For Local Government purposes it is in the All Saints Ward of Allerdale Borough Council and the Bothel + Wharrels Division of Cumbria County Council.

There is a joint parish council with the parishes of Embleton and Wythop, known as Embleton and District Parish Council.

Listed buildings

 there are nine listed buildings in the parish; Hewthwaite Hall, dating from 1581, is grade II* and the others are grade II.

References

External links
 Cumbria County History Trust: Setmurthy (nb: provisional research only – see Talk page)

Villages in Cumbria
Allerdale
Civil parishes in Cumbria